The Substance Abuse Prevention and Treatment Block Grant (SABG or SAPT) and the Community Mental Health Services Block Grant (MHBG or CMHS) are federal assistance block grants awarded by SAMHSA.

History
The Alcohol, Drug Abuse, and Mental Health Services Block Grant (ADMS block grant) was created in August 1981 with passage the Omnibus Budget Reconciliation Act of 1981. It replaced four earlier grant programs legislated by the Community Mental Health Centers Act, Mental Health Systems Act, Comprehensive Alcohol Abuse and Alcoholism Prevention, Treatment and Rehabilitation Act and Drug Abuse Prevention and Treatment Act. Whereas those grants had been administered by the National Institute on Alcohol Abuse and Alcoholism, National Institute on Drug Abuse, and National Institute of Mental Health, the ADMS grants were administered by the Alcohol, Drug Abuse, and Mental Health Administration. The 21st Century Cures Act replaced ADMS with the Substance Abuse Prevention and Treatment Block Grant ( et seq) and the Community Mental Health Services Block Grant ( et seq).

See also
 Social programs in the United States
 Administration of federal assistance in the United States

References

External links
 Substance Abuse Prevention and Treatment Block Grant (SABG) information from SAMHSA
 Community Mental Health Services Block Grant (MHBG) information from SAMHSA
 Substance Abuse Treatment account on USAspending.gov
 Mental Health account on USAspending.gov

Federal assistance in the United States
United States Department of Health and Human Services